David Allan Grindley (born 29 October 1972 in Hindley) is a British former 400 metres track and field athlete who reached the final of the men's individual 400 metres (where he placed sixth) and won bronze in the men's 4 x 400 metres relay in the 1992 Barcelona Olympics.

His personal best for the 400 metres is 44.47 seconds and is the fastest time by a British teenager.

Grindley had a spell playing Rugby Union with Aspull R.U.F.C

Grindley now works as an airline pilot and races (Road bicycle racing) for North Cheshire Clarion.

References

1972 births
Living people
People from Hindley, Greater Manchester
English male sprinters
British male sprinters
Olympic athletes of Great Britain
Olympic bronze medallists for Great Britain
Athletes (track and field) at the 1992 Summer Olympics
Medalists at the 1992 Summer Olympics
Olympic bronze medalists in athletics (track and field)
Universiade medalists in athletics (track and field)
Commercial aviators
Universiade bronze medalists for Great Britain
Medalists at the 1995 Summer Universiade